Fred Atkin (1887–1964) was an English professional footballer who played as a full-back.

References

1887 births
1964 deaths
People from Caistor
English footballers
Association football fullbacks
Tottenham Hotspur F.C. players
Grimsby Town F.C. players
Scunthorpe United F.C. players
English Football League players